Cezary Moleda (born 30 June 1960) is a Polish football manager.

References

1960 births
Living people
Polish football managers
Polonia Warsaw managers
People from Ciechanów